Girija Prasad Joshi (1939–1987) was a versatile Nepalese poet who set a new trend in Nepal Bhasa literature. His poems, epics, plays and novels broke tradition and crossed conventional boundaries. He has been honored with the title Great Poet.

Early life

Joshi was born in Sankhu (Sakwa), a small town in the Kathmandu Valley. His father was Dev Prasad and mother Khadga Devi Joshi. After finishing high school, he earned a bachelor's degree in education and taught in various schools. In 1981, he became headmaster of Rastriya Madhyamik Vidyalaya, Indrayani.

Literary career

Joshi published his first poem in Dharmodaya magazine in 1958. He has been described as being influenced by leftist views, but his works encompass a wide range of subjects from progressive to romantic.

His poems and stories speak up for the downtrodden masses. Joshi's writing career spanned the years of the repressive Panchayat system (1962–1990) when Nepal Bhasa writers were arrested and tortured. Writings in languages other than the Nepali language were stifled, and no new publications were allowed to be established. Against this backdrop, Joshi's works inspired literary and cultural movements.

Publications

Joshi was a prolific writer. During the period 1958 to 1987, he produced 11 novels, nine books of poetry, 10 story books, two epics, two plays and four books of songs. His greatest novels are Siluswan and Bipatra. Similarly, Silu-me: Cipukham is a well known novelette.

The poem entitled Hakugunya Nhapanmha Gayak ("The First Singer of the Black Hill") is the longest poem in Nepal Bhasa.

References 

1939 births
1987 deaths
People from Kathmandu District
Nepalese male poets
Newar-language writers
Nepalese male novelists
Nepalese dramatists and playwrights
Nepalese male short story writers
Nepalese short story writers
Nepali-language writers
Nepal Bhasa movement
20th-century novelists
20th-century Nepalese poets
20th-century dramatists and playwrights
20th-century short story writers
20th-century male writers
20th-century Nepalese male writers
Newar-language poets from Nepal
Newar people